Youngstown is an unincorporated community in Bay County, Florida, United States. It was the site of an unsolved deadly train derailment in 1978. It is part of the Panama City–Lynn Haven–Panama City Beach Metropolitan Statistical Area.

Geography

The main road through Youngstown is US 231, which runs from north to south through the community. US 231 leads north 62 mi (100 km) to Dothan, Alabama and southwest 20 mi (32 km) to Panama City.

US 231 is also the eastern terminus of County Road 388.

References

Unincorporated communities in Bay County, Florida
Unincorporated communities in Florida